Aratama Maru (Kanji:) was a merchant ship of the Empire of Japan. Launched in 1938, she was pressed into service as a munitions transport in World War II. Engulfed in flames, her crew abandoned her and were picked up by an escort vessel. After drifting for three days, the abandoned hull came to rest just inside the reef fringing Talofofo Bay on Guam's southeastern coast. While resting on the reef she split in half with the stern of the ship drifting off of the reef toward the Mariana Trench. The wreck was partially salvaged shortly afterward and was further salvaged in the 1960s, leaving only the hull remnants, the anchor with chain, and some elements of its superstructure. It has also been the subject of souvenir diving, and its position and condition have been affected by several typhoons. Seahorse damaged Kizugawa Maru in the same attack, which was towed into Apra Harbor for repairs and during a second American bombing attack was sank where she remains today.

The shipwreck was listed on the National Register of Historic Places in 1988.

See also
 National Register of Historic Places listings in Guam

References

External links
 

Merchant ships of Japan
World War II merchant ships of Japan
World War II shipwrecks in the Pacific Ocean
Shipwrecks on the National Register of Historic Places
National Register of Historic Places in Guam
World War II on the National Register of Historic Places in Guam
Ships built in Japan
Talofofo, Guam